The Wardens of Sing Sing are appointed by the Commissioner of the Department of Corrections and Community Supervision.

Elam Lynds (1825–1830)
Robert Wiltse (1830–1840)
David L. Seymour (1840–1843)
William H. Peck (warden) (1843–1845)
Hiram P. Rowell (1845–1848)
Chauncey Smith (1848–1849)
Edward L. Potter (January, 1849)
Alfred R. Booth (July, 1849)
Munson J. Lockwood (1850–1855)
C. A. Batterman (1855–1856)
William Beardsley (warden) (1856–1862)
Gaylord B. Hubbell (1862–1864)
Thomas E. Sutton (1864–1865)
Stephen H. Johnson (1865–1868)
David P. Forrest (1868–1869)
Henry Clay Nelson (1869–1870)
E. M. Russell (1870–1872)
Henry C. Nelson (1872–1873)
Gaylord B. Hubbell (1873–1874)
James Williamson (warden) (September 1874)
Alfred Walker (warden) (October 1874)
George R. Youngs (1876–1877)
Charles Davis (warden)  (February 1877)
Benjamin S. W. Clark (March 1877)
Charles Davis (warden) (1877–1880)
Augustus A. Brush (1880–1891)
W. R. Brown (1891–1893)
Charles F. Durston (1893–1894)
Omar Van Leuven Sage (1894–1899) 
Addison Johnson (1899–1907)
Jesse D. Frost (1907–1911)
John S. Kennedy (1911–1913)
James Connaughton (warden)* (June 1913) acting warden
James M. Clancy (1913–1914)
Thomas McCormick (June 1914)
George Standish Weed* (October 1914) acting warden
Thomas Mott Osborne (1914–1915)
George Washington Kirchwey (1915) 
Thomas Mott Osborne (July 1916) 
Calvin Derrick (October 1916)
William H. Moyer (1916–1919)
Edward V. Brophy (April 1919)
Daniel J. Grant* (1919–1920) acting warden
Lewis Edward Lawes (1920–1941)
Robert John Kirby (1941–1944)
William F. Snyder (1944–1950)
Wilfred Louis Denno (1950–1967) 
John T. Deegan (1967–1969)
James L. Casscles (1969–1972)
Theodore Schubin (1972–1975)
Joseph Higgins* (July 1975) acting warden
Harold Butler (warden) (October 1975)
William G. Gard (1975–1977)
Walter Fogg* (August 1977) acting warden
Stephen Dalsheim (1977–1980)
Wilson E.J. Walters (1980–1983)
James E. Sullivan (warden)  (1983–1988)
John P. Keane (1988–1997)
Charles Greiner (1997–2000)
Brian S. Fischer (2000–2007)
Luis Marshall (2007-2009)
Dawson J.W. Brown* (January 2009 - July 2009) acting Superintendent
Philip Heath (2009-2012)
Michael Capra (2012–present)
* denotes an acting warden who holds the position until a full-time warden can be appointed

References

 
Sing Sing